Jorge Leon Otálvaro Restrepo (born November 9, 1964 in Medellín) is a retired male road cyclist from Colombia, who was a professional from 1990 to 1997. He was nicknamed "Chacho" during his career.

Career

1991
1st in  National Championships, Road, Elite, Colombia (COL)
1992
2nd in Medellin (COL)
1st in  National Championships, Road, Elite, Colombia (COL)
1993
1st in Stage 3 Vuelta a Colombia, El Bordo (COL)
1994
1st in Stage 2 Vuelta a Colombia, Socorro (COL)

References
 

1964 births
Living people
Colombian male cyclists
Vuelta a Colombia stage winners
Sportspeople from Medellín